Mohamed Sowan is a Libyan Islamist activist and politician. He has been the leader of the Justice and Development Party since its foundation in March 2012. The Justice and Development Party is the political wing of the Libyan Muslim Brotherhood. Sowan is from the city of Misrata. He was imprisoned by the deposed Libyan Arab Jamahiriya government, until he was released in 2006 and subsequently worked as a hotel manager.

Personal life
Sowan is of Turkish origin.

References

Islamic democracy activists
Justice and Construction Party politicians
Living people
Libyan people of Turkish descent 
Libyan democracy activists
Libyan Sunni Muslims
Muslim Brotherhood leaders
Year of birth missing (living people)